Group 6 of the UEFA Euro 1976 qualifying tournament was one of the eight groups to decide which teams would qualify for the UEFA Euro 1976 finals tournament. Group 6 consisted of four teams: Soviet Union, Republic of Ireland, Turkey, and Switzerland, where they played against each other home-and-away in a round-robin format. The group winners were the Soviet Union, who finished one point above the Republic of Ireland.

Final table

Matches

 (*)NOTE: The first goal in other sources has also been reported as an own goal by Mick Martin or Terry Conroy. 

 (*)NOTE: Some sources state that the venue was St. Jakob-Park, Basel. 

 (*)NOTE: Attendance also reported as 45,000(**)NOTE: The own goal scorer has also been reported as Mikhail Fomenko.

Goalscorers

Notes

References

General references
 
 
 

Group 6
1974 in Soviet football
1975 in Soviet football
1974–75 in Republic of Ireland association football
1975–76 in Republic of Ireland association football
1974–75 in Turkish football
1975–76 in Turkish football
1974–75 in Swiss football
1975–76 in Swiss football